The San Bernardino Valley of Arizona is a  northeast-by-southwest trending valley in extreme southeast Cochise County, Arizona.
The north end of the valley merges into the northwest-by-southeast trending San Simon Valley; both merge in western perimeter Hidaldgo County, New Mexico. The valley is an asymmetric graben.

Valleys border all flanks of the Chiricahua Mountains massif (and some attached sub-ranges); The San Bernardino Valley borders the southeast of the Chiricahua Mountains; the San Simon Valley borders the northeast. San Bernardino Valley abuts the Peloncillo Mountains of New Mexico on the east, and the smaller adjoining range to its south, the Guadalupe Mountains. To the south, the valley borders Sonora, Mexico and the north regions of the Sierra del Tigre range, of Mexico. At the northern end of the Sierra del Tigre, the Rio San Bernardino joins the Bavispe River, then heads south to Mexico. To the northwest and west, the San Bernardino Valley abuts the Chiricahuas, Pedregosa, and Perilla Mountains.

At the very south of the valley, north of Douglas, Arizona–Agua Prieta, Mexico lies the San Bernardino National Wildlife Refuge. The refuge, grasslands, and wetlands are part of the south and southwest-flowing Yaqui River of Mexico that reaches the northeast region of the Gulf of California.

Geronimo–San Bernardino volcanic field
The San Bernardino Valley floor is covered by basaltic lava dating from 0.27 to 1.0 Ma (million years ago). The Geronimo–San Bernardino volcanic field is part of the larger Boot Heel volcanic field.

The field covers some 850 km2 and consists of olivine basalt flows, tuff rings and maars with 130 identified volcanic vent areas and cinder cones.

References

External links
 
 The Yaqui River Drainage, Americas Heritage Waters, Northern Arizona University
 Cuenca Los Ojos Foundation
 Paramore Crater (coordinates), (Topoquest)

Valleys of Arizona
Chiricahua Mountains
Landforms of Cochise County, Arizona
Landforms of Hidalgo County, New Mexico
Volcanic fields of New Mexico
Volcanism of Mexico